Ryan O'Neill, born April 26, 1978 in Lima, Pennsylvania is an American former professional soccer midfielder.

References
General
Ryan O'Neill profile at the Harrisbutrg City Islanders official website

1978 births
Living people
American soccer players
Penn FC players
USL Second Division players
Association football midfielders